LimeWire was a free peer-to-peer file sharing client for Windows, MacOS, Linux and Solaris. Created by Mark Gorton in 2000, it was most prominently a tool used for the download and distribution of pirated materials, particularly pirated music. In 2007, LimeWire was estimated to be installed on over one-third of all computers globally.

Both a zero-cost version and a purchasable "enhanced" version called LimeWire Pro were available; however, LimeWire Pro could be acquired for free through the standard LimeWire software, where users distributed it without authorization. LimeWire uses the gnutella network as well as the BitTorrent protocol. BitTorrent support is provided by libtorrent.

On October 26, 2010, U.S. federal court judge Kimba Wood issued an injunction ordering Lime Wire LLC to prevent "the searching, downloading, uploading, file trading and/or file distribution functionality, and/or all functionality" of its software in Arista Records LLC v. Lime Group LLC. A trial investigating the damages necessary to compensate the affected record labels was scheduled to begin in January 2011. As a result of the injunction, the RIAA initially suggested that LimeWire was responsible for $72 trillion in damages, before eventually settling for $105 million. Thereafter, the company stopped distributing the LimeWire software, and versions 5.5.11 and newer have been disabled using a backdoor installed by the company. However, version 5.5.10 and all prior versions of LimeWire remain fully functional and cannot be disabled unless a user upgrades to one of the newer versions.

Features 
Written in the Java programming language, LimeWire can run on any computer with a Java Virtual Machine installed. Installers were provided for Apple's Mac OS X, Microsoft's Windows, and Linux. Support for Mac OS 9 and other previous versions was dropped with the release of LimeWire 4.0.10. From version 4.8 onwards, LimeWire works as a UPnP Internet Gateway Device controller in that it can automatically set up packet-forwarding rules with UPnP-capable routers.

LimeWire offers sharing of its library through the Digital Audio Access Protocol (DAAP). As such, when LimeWire is running and configured to allow it, any files shared are detectable and downloaded on the local network by DAAP-enabled devices (e.g., Zune, iTunes). Beginning with LimeWire 4.13.9, connections can be encrypted with Transport Layer Security (TLS). Following LimeWire 4.13.11, TLS became the default connection option.

Version history 
Until October 2010, Lime Wire LLC, the New York City based developer of LimeWire, distributed two versions of the program: a basic gratis version, and an enhanced version, LimeWire PRO, which sold for a fee of $21.95 with 6 months of updates, or around $35.00 with 1 year of updates. The company claimed the paid version provides faster downloads and 66% better search results. This is accomplished by facilitating direct connection with up to 10 hosts of an identical searched file at any one time, whereas the gratis version is limited to a maximum of 8 hosts.

Being free software, LimeWire has spawned forks, including LionShare, an experimental software development project at Penn State University, and Acquisition, a Mac OS X-based gnutella client with a proprietary interface. Researchers at Cornell University developed a reputation management add-in called Credence that allows users to distinguish between "genuine" and "suspect" files before downloading them. An October 12, 2005, report states that some of LimeWire's contributors have forked the project and called it FrostWire.

LimeWire was the second file sharing program after FrostWire to support firewall-to-firewall file transfers, a feature introduced in version 4.2, which was released in November 2004. LimeWire also now includes BitTorrent support, but is limited to three torrent uploads and three torrent downloads, which coexist with ordinary downloads. LimeWire 5.0 added an instant messenger that uses the XMPP Protocol, a free software communication protocol. Users can chat and share files with individuals or a group of friends in their buddy list.

From version 5.5.1, LimeWire has added a key activation, which requires the user to enter the unique key before activating the "Pro" version of the software. This has stopped people from using downloaded "Pro" versions without authorization. However, there are still ways to bypass this security feature, which was done when creating the "Pirate Edition". For example, cracked versions of LimeWire were available on the Internet (including on LimeWire itself), and people could continue using the LimeWire Pro 5.5.1 Beta, which also includes AVG for LimeWire and is the first version to include AVG. The most recent stable version of LimeWire is 5.5.16.

Versions of LimeWire prior to 5.5.10 can still connect to the Gnutella network and users of these versions are still able to download files, even though a message is displayed concerning the injunction during the startup process of the software. LimeWire versions 5.5.11 and newer feature an auto-update feature that allowed Lime Wire LLC to disable newer versions of the LimeWire software. Older versions of LimeWire prior to version 5.5.11, however, do not include the auto-update feature and are still fully functional. As a result, neither the Recording Industry Association of America (RIAA) nor Lime Wire LLC have the ability to disable older versions of LimeWire, unless the user chooses to upgrade to a newer version of LimeWire.

On November 10, 2010, a secret group of developers called the "Secret Dev Team" sought to keep the application working by releasing the "LimeWire Pirate Edition". The software is based on LimeWire 5.6 Beta, and is aimed to allow Windows versions to still work and remove the threat of spyware or adware. The exclusive features in LimeWire PRO were also unlocked, and all security features installed by Lime Wire LLC were removed.

Forks and alternatives 
A number of forks of LimeWire have been released, many with the goal of giving users more freedom, or in objection to design decisions made by the original developers.

FrostWire 

FrostWire was started in September 2004 by members of the LimeWire community, after LimeWire's distributor considered adding "blocking" code, in response to RIAA pressure and the threat of legal action, in light of the U.S. Supreme Court's decision in MGM Studios, Inc. v. Grokster, Ltd.. When eventually activated, the code could block its users from sharing licensed files. This code was changed when lawsuits had been filed against LimeWire for P2P downloading. It had blocked all their users and redirected them to FrostWire. FrostWire has since completely moved to the BitTorrent protocol from Gnutella (LimeWire's file sharing network).

LimeWire Pirate Edition/WireShare 

In November 2010, as a response to the legal challenges regarding LimeWire, an anonymous individual by the handle of Meta Pirate released a modified version of LimeWire Pro, which was entitled LimeWire Pirate Edition. It came without the Ask.com toolbar, advertising, spyware, and backdoors, as well as all dependencies on Lime Wire LLC servers.

In response to allegations that a current or former member of Lime Wire LLC staff wrote and released the software, the company has stated they were "not behind these efforts. LimeWire does not authorize them. LimeWire is complying with the Court's October 26, 2010 injunction."

The LimeWire team, after being accused by the RIAA of being complicit in the development of LimeWire Pirate Edition, swiftly acted to shut down the LimeWire Pirate Edition website. A court order was issued to close down the website, and, to remain anonymous, Meta Pirate, the developer of LimeWire PE, did not contest the order.

Following the shutdown, the original LimeWire project was reforked into WireShare, with the intent to keep the Gnutella network alive and to maintain a good faith continuation of the original project (without adware or spyware); development of the software continues to this day.

MuWire 
MuWire was released in August 2020 as a free software program resembling LimeWire. Developed by a former LimeWire developer, it uses I2P to anonymize connections and transfers. MuWire's developer had purchased the limewire.com domain after it had been allowed to expire, and redirected traffic to MuWire's website for approximately two years, until finally selling it to an unaffiliated party.

Criticism 

Prior to April 2004, the free version of LimeWire was distributed with a bundled program called LimeShop (a variant of TopMoxie), which was spyware. Among other things, LimeShop monitored online purchases in order to redirect sales commissions to Lime Wire LLC. Uninstallation of LimeWire would not remove LimeShop. With the removal of all bundled software in LimeWire 3.9.4 (released on April 20, 2004), these objections were addressed. LimeWire currently has a facility that allows its server to contact a running LimeWire client and gather various information.

In LimeWire versions before 5.0, users could accidentally configure the software to allow access to any file on their computer, including documents with personal information. Recent versions of LimeWire do not allow unintentional sharing of documents or applications. In 2005, the US Federal Trade Commission issued a warning regarding the dangers of using peer-to-peer file sharing networks, stating that using such networks can lead to identity theft and lawsuits.

An identity theft scheme involving LimeWire was discovered in Denver in 2006. On September 7, 2007, Gregory Thomas Kopiloff of Seattle was arrested in what the U.S. Justice Department described as its first case against someone accused of using file sharing computer programs to commit identity theft. According to federal prosecutors, Kopiloff used LimeWire to search other people's computers for inadvertently shared financial information and then used it to obtain credit cards for an online shopping spree.

One investigation showed that of 123 randomly selected downloaded files, 37 contained malware – about 30%. In mid-2008, a Macintosh trojan exploiting a vulnerability involving Apple Remote Desktop was distributed via LimeWire affecting users of Mac OS X Tiger and Leopard. The ability to distribute such malware and viruses has also been reduced in versions of LimeWire 5.0 and greater, with the program defaulting to not share or search for executable files.

On May 5, 2009, a P2P industry spokesman represented Lime Wire and others at a U.S. House of Representatives legislative hearing on H.R. 1319, "The Informed P2P User Act".

On February 15, 2010, LimeWire reversed its previous anti-bundling stance and announced the inclusion of an Ask.com-powered browser toolbar that users had to explicitly opt-out of to prevent installation. The toolbar sends web and BitTorrent searches to Ask.com, and LimeWire searches to an instance of LimeWire on the user's machine.

LimeWire automatically receives a cryptographically signed file, called simpp.xml, containing an IP block list. It was the key technology behind the now defunct cyber security firm Tiversa which is alleged to have used information from the network to pressure prospective clients into engaging the company's services.

Injunction 

According to a June 2005 report in The New York Times, Lime Wire LLC was considering ceasing its distribution of LimeWire because the outcome of MGM v. Grokster "handed a tool to judges that they can declare inducement whenever they want to".

On May 12, 2010, Judge Kimba Wood of the United States District Court for the Southern District of New York ruled in Arista Records LLC v. Lime Group LLC that LimeWire and its creator, Mark Gorton, had committed copyright infringement, engaged in unfair competition, and induced others to commit copyright infringement. On October 26, 2010, LimeWire was ordered to disable the "searching, downloading, uploading, file trading and/or file distribution functionality" after losing a court battle with the RIAA over claims of copyright infringement. The RIAA also announced intentions to pursue legal action over the damages caused by the program in January to compensate the affected record labels. In retaliation, the RIAA's website was taken offline on October 29 via denial-of-service attacks executed by members of Operation Payback and Anonymous.

In response to the ruling, a company spokesperson said that the company is not shutting down, but will use its "best efforts" to cease distributing and supporting P2P software.

In early 2011, the RIAA announced their intention to sue LimeWire, pursuing a statutory damages theory that claimed up to $72 trillion in damagesa sum greater than the GDP of the entire global economy at the time. There are currently around 11,000 songs on LimeWire that have been tagged as copyright-infringed, and the RIAA estimates that each one has been downloaded thousands of times, the penalties accruing to the above sum.

A trial to decide on the eventual amount of damages owed by LimeWire to thirteen record labels, including Warner Music Group and Sony Music, all of which are represented by the RIAA, started early in May and went on until on May 13, 2011, when Gorton agreed to pay the 13 record companies $105 million in an out-of-court settlement.

Mitch Bainwol, chairman of the RIAA, referred to the "resolution of the case [as] another milestone in the continuing evolution of online music to a legitimate marketplace that appropriately rewards creators."

Reuse of trademark 
On March 9, 2022, brothers Paul and Julian Zehetmayr announced that they would revive LimeWire as a music-based NFT platform, though the new marketplace is not affiliated with LimeWire’s original team. The NFT marketplace was launched in July 2022, with the first NFT collection from American record producer and rapper 7 Aurelius.

Mark Gorton has expressed displeasure with the reuse of the LimeWire name in this way.

See also 

 Comparison of file sharing applications
 Open Music Model

Similar court rulings 
 AllOfMP3
 Grooveshark
 Kazaa
 Mininova
 Megaupload
 Napster

References

Sources

External links 

 10 Alternatives to LimeWire (2012), Zeropaid.com
 LimeWire Resurrected By Secret Dev Team (2010), TorrentFreak

2000 software
BitTorrent clients for Linux
Classic Mac OS software
Cross-platform software
File sharing software for Linux
Free BitTorrent clients
Free file sharing software
Free software programmed in Java (programming language)
Gnutella clients
Internet services shut down by a legal challenge
Java platform software
MacOS file sharing software
Software that bundles malware
Windows file sharing software